Majid Namjoo is an Iranian politician who was the minister of energy in second cabinet of Mahmoud Ahmadinejad.

Early life
Namjoo was born in Tehran on 5 January 1963.

Career
Namjoo was a member of Kerman city Council from 2001 to 2008 and became deputy minister of energy in February 2008. President Mahmoud Ahmadinejad nominated Namjoo as minister of energy in August 2009 and he was approved by the Majlis as the minister with 210 out of 290 votes. Namjoo's tenure ended on 15 August 2013 and he was replaced by Hamid Chitchian in the post.

Sanctions
Namjoo was put by the European Union into the sanction list due to his connection to Iran's nuclear program on 16 October 2012.

References

|-

1962 births
Living people
Government ministers of Iran
Popular Front of Islamic Revolution Forces politicians
Impeached Iranian officials
People from Kerman Province